Ted "Milkman" Alvarez Jr. (born September 27, 1929) is an American former politician in the state of Florida. Alvarez was born in Jacksonville. He attended University of Florida and was a dairy executive. From 1966 to 1972, he served in the Florida House of Representatives, representing the 19th district for four terms.

References

Living people
1929 births
Hispanic and Latino American state legislators in Florida
Democratic Party members of the Florida House of Representatives
University of Florida alumni